The Salta tuco-tuco (Ctenomys saltarius) is a species of rodent in the family Ctenomyidae. It is endemic to Argentina and Bolivia.

References

Tuco-tucos
Mammals of Argentina
Endemic fauna of Argentina
Mammals described in 1912
Taxa named by Oldfield Thomas
Taxonomy articles created by Polbot